The Urban Folk Quartet (commonly known as The UFQ or simply UFQ) are a four-piece contemporary folk band launched in June 2009. The band is composed of Joe Broughton (Fiddle, Guitar, Mandolin), Paloma Trigás (Fiddle, Vocals), Tom Chapman (Cajón, Percussion, Vocals) and Dan Walsh (Banjo, Guitar, Vocals). To date, the band has released three studio albums and three live albums.

History

Active since 2009, on their fourth outing as a band they won the Spanish International Folk Competition.

In 2010, they played at Sidmouth Folk Festival Fringe, The Big Chill Festival and Moseley Folk Festival. Their self-titled debut album was released through Fellside Recordings in 2010 and they won The Hancock Award for Best Newcomer.

In 2011, they appeared at Islands Folk Festival in Canada, Sidmouth Folk Festival Fringe and Fairport's Cropredy Convention. The band also released a live album, The Urban Folk Quartet: Live, to coincide with their appearance at Fairport's Cropredy Convention.

In March 2012, the band released their third album, Off Beaten Tracks, recorded in the summer of 2011 between dates in Spain, Germany, Canada, Italy and The UK.

May 2013 saw the recording of two appearances, in London and Birmingham, towards UFQ Live II, their second live album, released 8 November 2013 at Kings Place in London. 
	
Frank Moon departed the band following their autumn 2013 tour, replaced by Dan Walsh (banjo player) on banjo, guitar and vocals.
	
The band released studio album The Escape on 1 May 2015. The album was listed on Martin Chilton's "Best of Folk 2015" list compiled for The Telegraph, as well as appearing on Folk Radio UK's Best of 2015 and Shire Folk's top ten of 2015, where they took the number two spot. The UFQ played tracks from the album live in session on Mark Radcliffe's BBC Radio 2 Folk Show on 24 June 2015, which led to their track The Breakthrough/Barnstorming being included on compilation album The Mark Radcliffe Folk Sessions 2015. "The Escape Tour" saw the band play dates across England as well as appearances in Wales, France, Belgium and Denmark throughout 2015 and continued into 2016 with 16 spring dates across the UK.
	
Following Trigás and Broughton's contributions to her 2015 single The Answer, the band were invited to play a support set for Joss Stone at the Roundhouse in Camden, London on 15 May 2016. Curated by Stone, her only 2016 UK appearance, "Joss Stone And Friends", saw the singer take the stage with guests Lemar, Nitin Sawhney, Jocelyn Brown, Dennis Bovell, Linton Kwesi Johnson and Linda Lewis, for a charity event, streamed live around the world, in celebration of UK children's charity Barnardo's 150th anniversary.

The Urban Folk Quartet Live III was released on 21 October 2016. Taken from recordings of concerts in Stafford, Bristol, Maldon and Chester during "The Escape Tour" the album is the band's first live release to feature Dan Walsh and continues their pattern of alternating studio albums with live albums.

Discography

Studio albums
 The Urban Folk Quartet (2010)
 Off Beaten Tracks (2012)
 The Escape (2015)

Live
 The Urban Folk Quartet: Live (2011)
 UFQ Live II (2013)
 The Urban Folk Quartet Live III (2016)

Awards
 Winners, Spanish International Folk Competition 2009.
 Hancock award for best new act of 2010.

References

External links
 The Urban Folk Quartet official website

Musical groups established in 2009
British folk music groups